Jakob Hlasek (born 12 November 1964) is a Swiss former professional tennis player of Czech origin. He won a major doubles title at the 1992 French Open, partnering Marc Rosset.

Career
The major highlights of Hlasek's career came in 1992. He won the French Open men's doubles title that year (partnering fellow Swiss player Marc Rosset). He was also a member of Switzerland Davis Cup team which reached the final of the 1992 Davis Cup (where they were defeated by the United States), and won the 1992 Hopman Cup (partnering Manuela Maleeva-Fragnière). His best Grand Slam performance was reaching the quarter finals of the 1991 French Open, defeating David Pate, Emilio Sánchez, Tomás Carbonell and Christian Miniussi before losing to Andre Agassi.

Further success for his country came in 1996, when Hlasek was a member of the Swiss team which won the World Team Cup.

During his career, Hlasek won five top-level singles titles and 20 doubles titles. His career-high singles ranking was world no. 7, and his career-high doubles ranking was world no. 4 (both attained in 1989). His career prize-money earnings totalled $5,895,293.

Career finals

Singles: 14 (5 wins – 9 losses)

Doubles: 35 (20 wins – 15 losses)

Performance timelines

Singles

Doubles

External links
 
 
 

1964 births
Hopman Cup competitors
Living people
Olympic tennis players of Switzerland
Tennis players from Prague
Swiss male tennis players
Swiss people of Czech descent
Tennis players at the 1984 Summer Olympics
Tennis players at the 1988 Summer Olympics
Tennis players at the 1992 Summer Olympics
Grand Slam (tennis) champions in men's doubles
French Open champions
Czechoslovak emigrants to Switzerland